was a Japanese company that provided anime studio services including production, music, subtitles and translation. From 1993 to 2001, it also developed and published video games. KSS also created the adult brand Pink Pineapple.

History
The company changed its name to KSS Inc. in the early 1990s.

In 2004, KSS went bankrupt and sold its assets to Softgarage.

Anime projects

 Barbapapa
 Battle Angel (OVA) 
 Calimero
 Comic Party
 Comic Party Revolution 
 Dokyusei 2 (OVA) 
 Dosokai Yesterday Once More (OVA) 
 Dragon Knight: The Wheel of Time (OVA) 
 Elf ban Kakyuusei (OVA) 
 Elf Princess Rane (OVA) 
 Fire Emblem (OVA) 
 Golden Boy (OVA)
 Guardian Hearts (OVA)
 Happy Lesson (OVA)
 Happy Lesson
 Happy Lesson Advance
 Happy Lesson The Final (OVA)
 Happy World! (OVA)
 The Heroic Legend of Arslan (OVA) 
 Iczelion (OVA)
 Idol Project (OVA) 
 Judge (OVA) 
 Legend of Basara
 Level C (OVA) 
 Lime-iro Senkitan 
 Maps
 Mask of Zeguy (OVA) 
 Mighty Space Miners (OVA) 
 Moekan (OVA)
 Naruto
 Oh My Goddess! (OVA)
 One: Kagayaku Kisetsu e (OVA)
 Phantom - The Animation (OVA) 
 Plastic Little (OVA) 
 Rei Rei (OVA) 
 Saiyuki Reload 
 Tattoon Master (OVA) 
 To Heart
 True Love Story (OVA) 
 Variable Geo (OVA) 
 Wedding Peach 
 Wind: A Breath of Heart (OVA)

Video game projects
 Aoki Densetsu Shoot!
 Bing Bing! Bingo
 Casper (Super Famicom release)
 Goiken Muyou: Anarchy in the Nippon
 Majyūō (King of Demons)
 Max Surfing 2000
 Yokozuna Monogatari

References

External links
 Homepage
 

Anime companies
Companies that have filed for bankruptcy in Japan
Defunct video game companies of Japan
Video game publishers